The Royal Mines Act 1688 (1 Will & Mary c 30), sometimes referred to as the Mines Royal Act, is an Act of the Parliament of England.

This Act was partly in force in Great Britain at the end of 2010.

The Royal Mines Act 1688 repealed the Act Against Multipliers (5 Henry IV c. 4) (1404) which had made it a felony to create gold and silver by means of alchemy.

The Act specified also that "no mine of tin, copper, iron or, lead, shall hereafter be adjudged, reputed, or taken to be a royal mine although gold or silver may be extracted out of the same."  In doing so, the Act brought to an end the monopolies of the Society of Mines Royal and the Company of Mineral and Battery Works which had enjoyed exclusive rights to extract metal from certain mines.

According to Isaac Newton, in a letter to John Locke, Robert Boyle 'procured the repeal of the Act of Parliament against Multipliers'.  He further claimed that Boyle must then have had in his hands a recipe for the production of gold by alchemical means.

The Royal Mines Act 1688, except the last section, was repealed by section 1 of, and the Schedule to, the Statute Law Revision Act 1867.

Section 3
In this section, the words to "aforesaid that" were repealed by section 1 of, and Schedule 1 to, the Statute Law Revision Act 1948.

See also
The Royal Mines Act 1693

References
Halsbury's Statutes,

External links
The Royal Mines Act 1688, as amended, from Legislation.gov.uk.

1689 in law
1689 in England
Acts of the Parliament of England
Acts of the Parliament of England still in force
Mining in England
Mining law and governance